P. neglecta may refer to:
 Polylepis neglecta, a plant species endemic to Bolivia
 Pterodroma neglecta, the Kermadec petrel, a seabird species found in Australia, Chile and Japan

Synonyms
 Paludicola neglecta, a synonym for Physalaemus cuvieri, a frog species
 Pelias neglecta, a synonym for Vipera berus, a snake species

See also
 Neglecta (disambiguation)